Danella is both a surname and a given name. Notable people with the name include:

Utta Danella (1920–2015), German writer
Danella Lucioni (born 1984), Italian model

See also
Danell

Feminine given names